

Player awards (NBA)

Regular Season MVP 

 Larry Bird, Boston Celtics

NBA Finals MVP 

 Larry Bird, Boston Celtics

Slam Dunk Contest 

 Spud Webb, Atlanta Hawks

Three-point Shootout 

 Larry Bird, Boston Celtics

Collegiate awards
 Men
John R. Wooden Award: Walter Berry, St. John's
Frances Pomeroy Naismith Award: Jim Les, Bradley
Associated Press College Basketball Player of the Year: Walter Berry, St. John's
NCAA basketball tournament Most Outstanding Player: Keith Smart, Indiana
Associated Press College Basketball Coach of the Year: Eddie Sutton, Kentucky
Naismith Outstanding Contribution to Basketball: Adolph Rupp
 Women
Naismith College Player of the Year: Cheryl Miller, USC
Wade Trophy: Kamie Ethridge, Texas
Frances Pomeroy Naismith Award: Kamie Ethridge, Texas
NCAA basketball tournament Most Outstanding Player: Clarissa Davis, Texas
Carol Eckman Award: Laura Mapp, Bridgewater

Naismith Memorial Basketball Hall of Fame
Class of 1986:
Billy Cunningham
Tom Heinsohn
Red Holzman
Fred Taylor
Stan Watts

Births

 May 7—Matee Ajavon American college basketball player (Rutgers) and the WNBA (Atlanta Dream)

Deaths
June 19 – Len Bias, American college player (Maryland) and Boston Celtics draft pick (born 1963)
December 1 – Halbert Harvill, American college men's coach (Austin Peay) (born 1893)

See also
 1986 in sports

References